The 17th Tejano Music Awards were held in 1997. They recognized accomplishments by musicians from the previous year. The Tejano Music Awards is an annual awards ceremony recognizing Tejano music musicians.

The Hometown Boys entered the awards ceremony with 5 nominations.

Winners 

Album 

Album of the Year: Como Te Extraño Pete Astudillo 

Orchestra Album of the Year: Como Te Extraño Pete Astudillo

Song 

Best Instrumental Award: Joe's Special 10 - Hometown Boys 

Performer 

Rising Star Award: Eddie Gonzalez

References 

Tejano Music Awards by year
Tejano Music Awards
Tejano Music Awards
Tejano Music Awards